Dragoljub Jeremić (9 August 1978 – 12 March 2022) was a Serbian footballer who played as a defender.

Club career
Jeremić spent most of his career at Partizan, making 59 league appearances and scoring one goal. He also spent some time on loan to Radnički Kragujevac, Panserraikos (Greece), and Rabotnički (Macedonia). After leaving Partizan, Jeremić briefly played for Bežanija, before retiring.

International career
At international level, Jeremić made four (non-official) appearances for FR Yugoslavia at the Millennium Super Soccer Cup hosted by India in January 2001.

Death
Jeremić died on 12 March 2022, aged 43.

Career statistics

Honours
Partizan
 First League of FR Yugoslavia: 1998–99, 2001–02, 2002–03
 FR Yugoslavia Cup: 1997–98, 2000–01
Rabotnički
 Macedonian First Football League: 2005–06

References

External links
 
 
 

1978 births
2022 deaths
Footballers from Belgrade
Serbia and Montenegro footballers
Serbian footballers
Association football defenders
FK Partizan players
FK Radnički 1923 players
Panserraikos F.C. players
FK Rabotnički players
FK Bežanija players
First League of Serbia and Montenegro players
Super League Greece 2 players
Macedonian First Football League players
Serbian SuperLiga players
Serbia and Montenegro expatriate footballers
Serbian expatriate footballers
Expatriate footballers in Greece
Expatriate footballers in North Macedonia
Serbia and Montenegro expatriate sportspeople in Greece
Serbian expatriate sportspeople in North Macedonia